The Comite River is a right-bank tributary of the Amite River, with a confluence near the city of Denham Springs, east of Baton Rouge, Louisiana. The river's source lies in the hills of the East and West Feliciana Parishes, and empties into the Amite River just north of U.S. Route 190 (Florida Blvd) near the eastern boundary of Baton Rouge.

Flooding
When violent rains that frequent the capital city region strike, the water from the hills and piney forest in the Felicianas drains down into this usually shallow and calm river and quickly transforms it.  During such flooding, the water flows southwards, sometimes flooding homes in outlying areas east of Baton Rouge. Floodwaters have been recorded to have covered Greenwell Springs Road in extreme conditions.

See also
2016 Louisiana floods

References

Rivers of Louisiana
Bodies of water of East Baton Rouge Parish, Louisiana
Bodies of water of East Feliciana Parish, Louisiana